Francis Michael Dunne (January 13, 1918– September 2, 1977) was an American actor, radio personality and disc jockey. He was active on television and in films from 1945–73, and was also credited as Steve Dunn, Michael Dunne, Stephan Dunne, and Steve Dunne.

Early years
Dunne was born in Northampton, Massachusetts. He majored in drama and journalism during his two-and-a-half years at the University of Alabama. While there, he worked at a local radio station and "found himself in love with the business."

Radio
Dunne worked as an announcer at a radio station in Worcester, Massachusetts, and then went to New York, where he worked as both an announcer and a newscaster. He went on to star as private eye Sam Spade in The Adventures of Sam Spade from 1950-51. He played Lucky Larson in Deadline Mystery (1947),, the title character Dr. Daniel Danfield  in Danger, Dr. Danfield (1946–47), and he was the announcer for The Jack Kirkwood Show (1943–46).

Television
In 1950, Dunne starred in Love and Kisses on KTSL-TV in Los Angeles. On network television, Dunne starred in the comedy Professional Father (1955). He was the announcer for The Bob Crosby Show (1958) and The Liberace Show (1958-1959).

In the 1960-61 season, he and Mark Roberts played private detective brothers in the syndicated television series The Brothers Brannagan. He was also the host of the game shows Truth or Consequences (nighttime version, 1957), You're On Your Own (1956-1957) and Double Exposure (1961).

Dunne appeared in several television shows, including Professional Father, The Millionaire, Alfred Hitchcock Presents, Petticoat Junction, Batman (episodes 47 and 48), Dragnet 1967, Nanny and the Professor, and The Brady Bunch.

Later years
In 1968, Dunne became director of sales for Hollywood Video Center, a division of Western Video Industries.

Dunne died on September 2, 1977, aged 59.

Personal life
Dunne married Vivian Belliveau in 1940. They had a son, Stephen, and a daughter, Margaret.

Partial filmography

 Junior Miss (1945) - Uncle Willis Reynolds
 Doll Face (1945) - Frederick Manly Gerard
 Shock (1946) - Dr. Stevens
 Colonel Effingham's Raid (1946) - Prof. Edward 'Ed' Bland
 Mother Wore Tights (1947) - Roy Bivins
 The Son of Rusty (1947)
 The Woman from Tangier (1948) - Ray Shapley
 The Return of October (1948) - Prof. Stewart
 The Dark Past (1948) - Owen Talbot
 The Big Sombrero (1949) - Jimmy Garland
 Law of the Barbary Coast (1949) - Phil Morton
 Miss Grant Takes Richmond (1949) - Ralph Winton
 Kazan (1949)
 Rusty Saves a Life (1949)
 Lady Possessed (1952) - Tom Wilson
 The WAC from Walla Walla (1952) - Lt. Tom Mayfield
 The Gentle Gunman (1952) - Brennan (uncredited) 
 Above and Beyond (1952) - Maj. Harry Bratton, Co-Pilot B-29 Tests
 Cha-Cha-Cha Boom! (1956) - Bill Haven 
 Ten Thousand Bedrooms (1957) - Tom Crandall
 I Married a Woman (1958) - Bob Sanders
 Home Before Dark (1958) - Hamilton Gregory
 The Explosive Generation (1961) - Bobby Herman Sr.
 Hand of Death (1962) - Tom Holland
 Willy Wonka & the Chocolate Factory (1971) - Stanley Kael - Second Newscaster (uncredited)
 Superdad (1973) - TV Moderator (final film role)

References

External links
 
 
 Profile, digitaldeliftp.com; accessed January 29, 2018.

1918 births
1977 deaths
American male film actors
American male television actors
American male radio actors
20th-century American male actors
People from Northampton, Massachusetts
Male actors from Massachusetts